The 34th Vanier Cup was played on November 28, 1998, at the SkyDome in Toronto, Ontario, and decided the CIAU football champion for the 1998 season. The Saskatchewan Huskies won their third championship by defeating the Concordia Stingers by a score of 24-17.

Game summary
Saskatchewan Huskies (24) - TDs, Todd Lynden, Trevor Ludtke; FGs, Matt Kellett (3); cons., Matt Kellett (4); singles, Matt Kellett.

Concordia Stingers (17) - TDs, Evan Davis Jr., Greg Casey; cons., Dave Miller-Johnston (3).

Scoring summary
First Quarter
SSK - FG Kellett 28 (3:00)

Second Quarter
CON - FG Miller-Johnston 35 (6:20)
SSK - TD Lynden 9 pass from Reid (Kellett Convert) (13:04)

Third Quarter
SSK - Single Kellett 49 (2:35)
CON - TD Davis 55 run (Miller-Johnston convert) (5:53)
SSK - FG Kellett 27 (13:21)
CON - TD Casey 56 interception return (Miller-Johnston convert) (14:44)

Fourth Quarter
SSK - FG Kellett 40 (10:27)
SSK - TD Ludtke fumble recovery in end zone (Kellett convert) (12:52)

References

External links
 Official website

Vanier Cup
Vanier Cup
sports
November 1998 sports events in Canada
Canadian football competitions in Toronto